In the mathematical field of knot theory, Fox n-coloring is a method of specifying a representation of a knot group or a group of a link (not to be confused with a link group) onto the dihedral group of order n where n is an odd integer by coloring arcs in a link diagram (the representation itself is also often called a Fox n-coloring). Ralph Fox discovered this method (and the special case of tricolorability) "in an effort to make the subject accessible to everyone" when he was explaining knot theory to undergraduate students at Haverford College in 1956. Fox n-coloring is an example of a conjugation quandle.

Definition
Let L be a link, and let  be the fundamental group of its complement. The name "Fox coloring" was given to it much later by mathematicians who probably couldn't read German.] Fox's preferred term for so-called "Fox 3-coloring" was "property L"; see Exercise 6 on page 92 of his book "Introduction to Knot Theory" (1963).

By surjectivity of the representation these generators must map to reflections of a regular n-gon. Such reflections correspond to elements  of the dihedral group, where t is a reflection and s is a generating rotation of the n-gon. The generators of the group of a link given above are in bijective correspondence with arcs of a link diagram, and if a generator maps to  we color the corresponding arc . This is called a Fox n-coloring of the link diagram, and it satisfies the following properties:

At least two colors are used (by surjectivity of ).
Around a crossing, the average of the colors of the undercrossing arcs equals the color of the overcrossing arc (because  is a representation of the group of the link).

By a theorem of Montesinos and Hilden, any closed oriented 3-manifold may be obtained this way for some knot K and  some tricoloring of K. This is no longer true when n is greater than three.

Number of colorings
The number of distinct Fox n-colorings of a link L, denoted 

is an invariant of the link, which is easy to calculate by hand on any link diagram by coloring arcs according to the coloring rules. When counting colorings, by convention we also consider the case where all arcs are given the same color, and call such a coloring trivial. 

For example, the standard minimal crossing diagram of the Trefoil knot has 9 distinct tricolorings as seen in the figure:
 3 "trivial" colorings (every arc blue, red, or green)
 3 colorings with the ordering Blue→Green→Red
 3 colorings with the ordering Blue→Red→Green

The set of Fox 'n'-colorings of a link forms an abelian group , where the sum of two n-colorings is the n-coloring obtained by strandwise addition. This group splits as a direct sum
,
where the first summand corresponds to the n trivial (constant) colors, and nonzero elements of  summand correspond to nontrivial n-colorings (modulo translations obtained by adding a constant to each strand). 

Generalization to G-coloring
Let L be a link, and let π be the fundamental group of its complement, and let G be a group. A homomorphism  of π to G is called a G-coloring of L. 
A G-coloring of a knot diagram is an induced assigning an element of G to the strands of L such that, at each crossing, if c is the element of G assigned to the overcrossing strand and if a and b are the elements of G assigned to the two undercrossing strands, then a = c−1 b c or b = c−1 a c, depending on the orientation of the overcrossing strand. If the group G is dihedral of order 2n, this diagrammatic representation of a G-coloring reduces to a Fox n-coloring. The torus knot T(3,5) has only constant n-colorings, but for the group G equal to the alternating group A5, T(3,5) has non-constant G-colorings.

Further reading

 Richard H. Crowell, Ralph H. Fox, "An Introduction to Knot Theory", Ginn and Co., Boston, 1963. 
 Ralph H. Fox,  A quick trip through knot theory, in: M. K. Fort (Ed.), "Topology of 3-Manifolds and Related Topics", Prentice-Hall, NJ, 1961, pp. 120–167. 
 Ralph H. Fox, Metacyclic invariants of knots and links, Canadian Journal of Mathematics 22 (1970) 193–201. 
Józef H. Przytycki, 3-coloring and other elementary invariants of knots. Banach Center Publications, Vol. 42, "Knot Theory", Warszawa, 1998, 275–295.
Kurt Reidemeister, Knoten und Verkettungen, Math. Z. 29 (1929), 713-729. 

Knot theory